Diego Torresean Nunes (born November 30, 1982) is a Brazilian mixed martial artist. A professional since 2004, he has fought for the UFC, WEC, Bellator MMA, RXF, Fight Nights Global, and the Rizin Fighting Federation.

Mixed martial arts career
Diego trains with Team Nogueira Brazil. Nunes' professional career in mixed martial arts began in May 2004, when he defeated Jorge Santos Velho by TKO. He has fought in GP, TFC, Shooto, WEC and the UFC.

World Extreme Cagefighting
Diego won his WEC debut against Cole Province by unanimous decision at WEC 37. Nunes was scheduled to fight Cub Swanson on the undercard at WEC 40, but a hand injury just days before the bout, forced Nunes to cancel the fight. He next fought Rafael Dias at WEC 42 on August 9, 2009. Nunes defeated Dias via unanimous decision (30–27, 30–27, 30–27).

Nunes suffered his first professional loss to LC Davis via unanimous decision at WEC 44.

Nunes was expected to face Leonard Garcia on March 6, 2010 at WEC 47, but Nunes was forced from the card with an injury.  Nunes was replaced by former UFC fighter George Roop.

Nunes then faced Raphael Assunção on June 20, 2010 at WEC 49. He won the fight via split decision.

Nunes faced Tyler Toner on September 30, 2010 at WEC 51. He won the fight via unanimous decision.

Ultimate Fighting Championship
On October 28, 2010, World Extreme Cagefighting merged with the Ultimate Fighting Championship. As part of the merger, all WEC fighters were transferred to the UFC.

Nunes faced Mike Brown on January 1, 2011 at UFC 125. He won the fight via split decision.

Nunes faced Kenny Florian on June 11, 2011 at UFC 131. He lost the fight via unanimous decision.

Nunes was expected to face Manvel Gamburyan on September 24, 2011 at UFC 135, but Gamburyan pulled out of the fight due to a shoulder injury.  Then, on August 29, Nunes confirmed his own exit from the card, citing an injury.

Nunes/Gamburyan eventually took place on December 30, 2011 at UFC 141. Nunes won the fight via unanimous decision (29-28, 29-28, 29-28).

Nunes next faced Dennis Siver on April 14, 2012 at UFC on Fuel TV: Gustafsson vs. Silva. He lost the fight via unanimous decision.

Nunes faced Bart Palaszewski on October 5, 2012 at UFC on FX 5. After three full rounds, Nunes won the fight via unanimous decision (30-27, 29-28, 30-27). The performance also earned both participants Fight of the Night honors.

Nunes then faced Nik Lentz on January 19, 2013 at UFC on FX: Belfort vs. Bisping. He lost the fight via unanimous decision and was subsequently released from the promotion.

Bellator MMA
In June 2013, it was revealed that Nunes signed with Bellator MMA.

In his debut, Nunes faced prior title challenger Patricio Freire at Bellator 99 in the Quarterfinals of the season nine featherweight tournament. He lost the fight via knockout at just 1:19 in the first round. This is the first time that Nunes had ever been knocked out, or even finished, in his career.

In February 2014, Nunes entered into the Bellator season ten featherweight tournament.  He faced Matt Bessette in the quarterfinals at Bellator 110 and lost the back-and-forth fight via split decision.

Post Bellator

After an unsuccessful run in Bellator, Nunes faced longtime MMA veteran Joachim Hansen at Superior Challenge 11 for the featherweight title. Nunes won the fight by KO in the second round with a hard left hand after breaking his knee in the first round

Fight Nights Global (FNG)

After recovering from a knee injury for almost two years, Nunes signed with Fight Nights Global and his debut was at the Fight Nights Global 51: Dagestan battle 2, on 25 September 2016 against Rasul Mirzaev. He lost the fight by knockout in the first round.

Post FNG

After Fight Nights Global Nunes fought Radu Mihaita in Italy-based promotion Magnum FC in July 2017. Nunes won the fight via knockout.

In the beginning of December 2017, Nunes fought Michel Ersoy in Swedish promotion Superior Challenge. Nunes won the fight via guillotine choke.

Just two weeks after the fight with Ersoy, Nunes fought Corneliu Lascăr in Romania at RXF 29: All Stars and won via guillotine choke.

Rizin FF

After amassing a win streak of three in the European circuits, Nunes signed a contract with Rizin Fighting Federation. He was slated against Yusuke Yachi at Rizin 10 and lost a close fight via split decision.

Personal life
Diego is of Italian heritage. Diego is married with Karen Nunes. He is a Christian and regularly posts Bible verses on his Facebook page.

Championships and achievements
Ultimate Fighting Championship
Fight of the Night (One time) vs. Bart Palaszewski 
Superior Challenge
SC Featherweight Championship (One time, current)

Mixed martial arts record

|-
| Win
| align=center| 23–8
| Simon Sköld
| Submission (guillotine choke)
| Superior Challenge 19
| 
| align=center| 1
| align=center| 2:55
| Stockholm, Sweden
| 
|-
|Loss
|align=center| 22–8
|Yusuke Yachi
|Decision (split)
|Rizin 10
|
|align=center|3
|align=center|5:00
|Fukuoka, Japan 
|Lightweight bout.
|-
| Win
| align=center| 22–7
| Corneliu Lascăr 
| Submission (guillotine choke)
| RXF 29: All Stars
| 
| align=center| 3
| align=center| 4:46
| Brasov, Romania
|Lightweight bout.
|-
| Win
| align=center| 21–7
| Michel Ersoy
| Submission (guillotine choke)
| Superior Challenge 16
| 
| align=center| 2
| align=center| 0:54
| Stockholm, Sweden
| 
|-
| Win
| align=center| 20–7
| Radu Mihatu
| KO (punch)
| Magnum Fighting Championship 2
| 
| align=center| 1
| align=center| 0:25
| Rome, Italy
| 
|-
| Loss
| align=center| 19–7
| Rasul Mirzaev
| TKO (punches)
| Fight Nights Global 51: Pavlovich vs. Gelegaev
| 
| align=center| 1
| align=center| 1:45
| Kaspiysk, Dagestan, Russia
| 
|-
| Win
| align=center| 19–6
| Joachim Hansen
| KO (punch)
| Superior Challenge 11
| 
| align=center| 2
| align=center| 1:51
| Sodertalje, Sweden
| 
|-
| Loss
| align=center| 18–6
| Matt Bessette
| Decision (split)
| Bellator 110
| 
| align=center| 3
| align=center| 5:00
| Uncasville, Connecticut, United States
| 
|-
| Loss
| align=center| 18–5
| Patrício Freire
| KO (punch)
| Bellator 99
| 
| align=center| 1
| align=center| 1:19
| Temecula, California, United States
| 
|-
| Loss
| align=center| 18–4
| Nik Lentz
| Decision (unanimous)
| UFC on FX: Belfort vs. Bisping
| 
| align=center| 3
| align=center| 5:00
| São Paulo, Brazil
| 
|-
| Win
| align=center| 18–3
| Bart Palaszewski
| Decision (unanimous)
| UFC on FX: Browne vs. Bigfoot
| 
| align=center| 3
| align=center| 5:00
| Minneapolis, Minnesota, United States
| 
|-
| Loss
| align=center| 17–3
| Dennis Siver
| Decision (unanimous)
| UFC on Fuel TV: Gustafsson vs. Silva
| 
| align=center| 3
| align=center| 5:00
| Stockholm, Sweden
| 
|-
| Win
| align=center| 17–2
| Manvel Gamburyan
| Decision (unanimous)
| UFC 141
| 
| align=center| 3
| align=center| 5:00
| Las Vegas, Nevada, United States
| 
|-
| Loss
| align=center| 16–2
| Kenny Florian
| Decision (unanimous)
| UFC 131
| 
| align=center| 3
| align=center| 5:00
| Vancouver, British Columbia, Canada
| 
|-
| Win
| align=center| 16–1
| Mike Brown
| Decision (split)
| UFC 125
| 
| align=center| 3
| align=center| 5:00
| Las Vegas, Nevada, United States
| 
|-
| Win
| align=center| 15–1
| Tyler Toner
| Decision (unanimous)
| WEC 51
| 
| align=center| 3
| align=center| 5:00
| Broomfield, Colorado, United States
| 
|-
| Win
| align=center| 14–1
| Raphael Assunção
| Decision (split)
| WEC 49
| 
| align=center| 3
| align=center| 5:00
| Edmonton, Alberta, Canada
| 
|-
| Loss
| align=center| 13–1
| LC Davis
| Decision (unanimous)
| WEC 44
| 
| align=center| 3
| align=center| 5:00
| Las Vegas, Nevada, United States
| 
|-
| Win
| align=center| 13–0
| Rafael Dias
| Decision (unanimous)
| WEC 42
| 
| align=center| 3
| align=center| 5:00
| Las Vegas, Nevada, United States
| 
|-
| Win
| align=center| 12–0
| Cole Province
| Decision (unanimous)
| WEC 37: Torres vs. Tapia
| 
| align=center| 3
| align=center| 5:00
| Las Vegas, Nevada, United States
| 
|-
| Win
| align=center| 11–0
| Marcelo Franca
| Submission (guillotine choke)
| Shooto: Brazil 8
| 
| align=center| 1
| align=center| 2:20
| Rio de Janeiro, Brazil
| 
|-
| Win
| align=center| 10–0
| Henrique Mello
| KO (head kick)
| Top Fighting Championships 3
| 
| align=center| 1
| align=center| N/A
| Rio de Janeiro, Brazil
| 
|-
| Win
| align=center| 9–0
| Luciano Dos Santos
| Submission (guillotine choke)
| Sul Fight Championship 1
| 
| align=center| 1
| align=center| 4:40
| Santa Catarina, Brazil
| 
|-
| Win
| align=center| 8–0
| Jetron Azevedo
| Submission (armbar)
| Storm Samurai 10
| 
| align=center| 1
| align=center| N/A
| Brazil
| 
|-
| Win
| align=center| 7–0
| Piri Piri
| Submission (guillotine choke)
| Floripa Fight 1
| 
| align=center| 1
| align=center| 0:55
| Florianópolis, Brazil
| 
|-
| Win
| align=center| 6–0
| Einstein Santana
| Submission (guillotine choke)
| Battle Front 1
| 
| align=center| 1
| align=center| N/A
| Brazil
| 
|-
| Win
| align=center| 5–0
| Jorge dos Santos Velho
| TKO
| GP: Tornado 5
| 
| align=center| 1
| align=center| N/A
| Caxias do Sul, Brazil
| 
|-
| Win
| align=center| 4–0
| Giovani Diniz
| KO
| Profight Championships 3
| 
| align=center| N/A
| align=center| N/A
| Brazil
| 
|-
| Win
| align=center| 3–0
| Lindomar Silva
| Submission (guillotine choke)
| GP: Tornado 3
| 
| align=center| N/A
| align=center| N/A
| Brazil
| 
|-
| Win
| align=center| 2–0
| Michel Michel
| KO
| GP: Tornado 2
| 
| align=center| 1
| align=center| 0:30
| Brazil
| 
|-
| Win
| align=center| 1–0
| Jorge dos Santos Velho
| TKO (punches)
| Copa Gaucha: Fight Center 2
| 
| align=center| 2
| align=center| N/A
| Caxias do Sul, Brazil
|

See also
 List of Bellator MMA alumni

References

External links
Official UFC Profile

1982 births
Living people
Brazilian male mixed martial artists
Featherweight mixed martial artists
Mixed martial artists utilizing Brazilian jiu-jitsu
Brazilian practitioners of Brazilian jiu-jitsu
Ultimate Fighting Championship male fighters
Brazilian people of Italian descent
Brazilian Christians
People from Caxias do Sul
Sportspeople from Rio Grande do Sul